C'est Com...Com...Compliqué is the 9th studio album by the German krautrock group Faust, released in 2009.

The album contains remixes of the material that was originally mixed by Nurse With Wound and released as Disconnected in 2007.

Track listing
 "Kundalini Tremolos" – 9:03	
 "Accroché à tes Lèvres" – 7:48	
 "Ce Chemin est le Bon" – 7:53	
 "Stimmen" – 2:03	
 "Petits Sons Appétissants" – 4:18	
 "Bonjour Gioacchino" – 5:04	
 "En Veux-tu des Effets, en Voilà" – 7:18	
 "Lass Mich" (Original Version) – 1:54	
 "C'est Com...Com...Compliqué" – 13:40

References

External links

  at faust-pages.com.

2009 albums
Faust (band) albums